The pole vault at the Summer Olympics is grouped among the four track and field jumping events held at the multi-sport event. The men's pole vault has been present on the Olympic athletics programme since the first Summer Olympics in 1896. The women's event is one of the latest additions to the programme, first being contested at the 2000 Summer Olympics – along with the addition of the hammer throw, this brought the women's field event programme to parity with the men's.

Isinbayeva's 2008 mark was a world record at the time and her 2004 victory in  had been the first women's world record in the pole vault to be set at the Olympics.

William Hoyt was the first Olympic champion in 1896 and Stacy Dragila became the first female Olympic pole vault champion over 100 years later in 2000. Armand Duplantis and Katie Nageotte are the reigning Olympic champions from 2021. Yelena Isinbayeva and Bob Richards are the only two athletes to win two Olympic pole vault titles, and also the only two athletes to win more than two Olympic medals in the discipline. The United States is the most successful nation in the event.

Medalists

Men

 A Youtube video showcasing all pole vault's male Olympic winners can be found here

Multiple medalists

Medalists by country

 The German total includes teams both competing as Germany and the United Team of Germany, but not East or West Germany.

 A YouTube video showcasing all medal-winning countries can be found here.

Women

Multiple medalists

Medalists by country

Intercalated Games
The 1906 Intercalated Games were held in Athens and at the time were officially recognised as part of the Olympic Games series, with the intention being to hold a games in Greece in two-year intervals between the internationally held Olympics. However, this plan never came to fruition and the International Olympic Committee (IOC) later decided not to recognise these games as part of the official Olympic series. Some sports historians continue to treat the results of these games as part of the Olympic canon.

Continuing its presence since the first Olympics, a men's pole vault event was contested at the 1906 Games. France's Fernand Gonder entered as the world record holder and delivered by winning in an Olympic record-equalling mark. The runner-up, Bruno Söderström of Sweden, also won a javelin throw medal that year. Ed Glover, the American champion, was the bronze medallist.

Non-canonical Olympic events
In addition to the main 1900 Olympic men's pole vault, a handicap competition was held four days later. The joint fourth-place finishers in the main event took the top two spots, with Jakab Kauser posting a mark of 3.45 m with a handicap of 45 cm, and Eric Lemming coming second with his result of 3.40 m with a 30 cm handicap. Meredith Colket, the silver medallist in the main event registered 3.20 m with a handicap of 15 cm. Two further non-handicap "scratch" competitions were held that are no longer considered canon Olympic events: the American champion Bascom Johnson won an event on 16 July, then three days later Daniel Horton (a triple jump competitor) defeated Charles Dvorak in a consolation event – both had missed the final proper as it was held on the Sabbath. Dvorak went on to win the Olympic pole vault gold in 1904.

The handicap event returned at the 1904 Summer Olympics. LeRoy Samse, the runner-up in the main Olympic pole vault, won with 3.58 m and a handicap of one inch. Walter Dray, sixth in the Olympic event, came second with 3.58 m and a ten-inch handicap, while Olympic fifth placer Claude Allen recorded 3.55 m off a seven-inch handicap.

These events are no longer considered part of the official Olympic history of the pole vault or the athletics programme in general. Consequently, medals from these competitions have not been assigned to nations on the all-time medal tables.

References
Participation and athlete data
Athletics Men's Pole Vault Medalists. Sports Reference. Retrieved on 2014-05-03.
Athletics Women's Pole Vault Medalists. Sports Reference. Retrieved on 2014-05-03.
Olympic record progressions
Mallon, Bill (2012). TRACK & FIELD ATHLETICS - OLYMPIC RECORD PROGRESSIONS. Track and Field News. Retrieved on 2014-05-03.
Specific

External links
IAAF pole vault homepage
Official Olympics website
Olympic athletics records from Track & Field News
A video showcasing all pole vault's male Olympic winners
A Youtube video showcasing all medal-winning countries

 
Olympics
Pole vault